Sistema Globo de Rádio (in English: Globo Radio System), or SGR, is a Brazilian media group owned by Grupo Globo that began with the inauguration of Rádio Globo in 1944, and today it has control of several other radios from different parts of Brazil. SGR also operates in the Pay-TV segment, where its radios offer music programming options to more than 6 million subscribers of Sky Brazil, Oi TV and Claro TV+ operators. In 1975, the SGR began to adopt a logo whose letters resemble that of Globo Network, made by Hans Donner with the color dark blue, with the name of "Sistema Globo de Rádio". In 2009, the SGR started to have a distinct visual identity of Globo, adopting a logo in the colors blue and gray, with the name SGR.

Previously, the group operated in the web radio segment, with Multishow FM, GNT Radio, Radio Canal Brasil and Radio Impacto, as well as Globo FM and RadioBeat, which replaced its former terrestrial stations in Rio de Janeiro. In 2015, with the extinction of these last two, the SGR stopped operating with web radios.

Stations 
 BH FM - 102.1 MHz
 CBN RJ - 92.5 MHz
 CBN SP - 90.5 MHz
 CBN Brasília - 95.3 MHz
 CBN Belo Horizonte -106.1 MHz
 Globo RJ FM - 98.1 MHz

External links 
  - Grupo Globo

Mass media in Rio de Janeiro (city)
Grupo Globo subsidiaries
1944 establishments in Brazil